The 14th Lo Nuestro Awards ceremony, presented by Univision and honoring the best Latin music of 2001 and 2002, took place on February 7, 2002, at a live presentation held at the James L. Knight Center in Miami, Florida. The ceremony was broadcast in the United States and Latin America by Univision.

During the ceremony, twenty-nine categories were presented. Winners were announced at the live event and included Puerto-Rican American singer Olga Tañón receiving four competitive awards. Mexican band Palomo won three awards. Mexican singer-songwriter Juan Gabriel, Chilean band La Ley, and Mexican-American performer Lupillo Rivera earned two accolades. Puerto-Rican American singer Gilberto Santa Rosa also was awarded in two categories and received a special tribute along with Juan Gabriel.  Mexican singer José José was presented with the Excellence Award.

Background 
In 1989, the Lo Nuestro Awards were established by Univision, to recognize the most talented performers of Latin music. The nominees and winners were selected by a voting poll conducted among program directors of Spanish-language radio stations in the United States and the results were tabulated and certified by the accounting firm Arthur Andersen. The trophy awarded is shaped like a treble clef. The 14th Lo Nuestro Awards ceremony was held on February 7, 2002, in a live presentation held at the James L. Knight Center in Miami, Florida. The ceremony was broadcast in the United States and Latin America by Univision. The categories included were for the Pop, Tropical/Salsa, Regional Mexican and Music Video fields before the 2000 awards, from 2001 onwards categories were expanded and included a Rock field; for the Regional Mexican genre a Ranchera, Grupero, Tejano and Norteño fields were added; and Traditional, Merengue and Salsa performances were also considered in the Tropical/Salsa field. At the live show presentation, Spanish singer Enrique Iglesias debuted the music video of the song "Escape".

Nominees and winners 

Winners were announced before the live audience during the ceremony. Puerto Rican American singer Olga Tañón was the most nominated performer and won her four nominations, including Tropical/Salsa Song of the Year for the single "Cómo Olvidar". Tañón also earned the "People Choice Award" in the Tropical/Salsa field for her album Yo Por Ti. Mexican singer-songwriter Juan Gabriel earned the accolade for Pop Album and Pop Song of the Year for "Abrázame Muy Fuerte", the best-performing Latin single of 2001 in the United States. 

Mexican band Palomo won three awards in the Regional/Mexican field: Tejano Performance, Group and Song of the Year for the track "No Me Conoces Aún", which spent 31 weeks at number-one in the Billboard Regional Mexican Songs chart, the longest reign on any Nielsen Company BDS-based airplay chart in history. Colombian singer-songwriter Shakira was awarded the "People Choice" for Pop/Rock performance for her album Laundry Service; Mexican singer Thalía won for Regional/Mexican artist, and for the first time the Video of the Year was also selected by the audience and was awarded to Enrique Iglesias for "Héroe".

Nominees and winners of the 13th Annual Lo Nuestro Awards (winners listed first).

Special awards
Excellence Award: José José
Special tribute: Gilberto Santa Rosa and Juan Gabriel.
Premio del Pueblo (People Choice):
Pop/Rock: Shakira for Laundry Service.
Tropical: Olga Tañón for Yo Por Ti.
Regional/Mexican: Thalía.

See also
2001 in Latin music
2002 in Latin music
Latin Grammy Awards of 2002
Grammy Award for Best Latin Pop Album

References

2002 music awards
Lo Nuestro Awards by year
2002 in Florida
2002 in Latin music
2000s in Miami